Elfrida is a census-designated place in Cochise County, Arizona, United States. As of the 2010 census it had a population of 459.

Description
Elfrida has the United States Postal Service Zip Code of 85610.

Elfrida is home to Valley Union High School grades 9–12 and Elfrida Elementary School grades K–8.

Chiricahua Community Health Centers was founded in Elfrida in 1986.

Elfrida Community Center is north of the center crossroads.

Elfrida gained a library, circa March 2000.  The Elfrida Library is part of the Cochise County Library District.

The Elfrida Fire Department is south of the center crossroads.

Demographics

Climate
According to the Köppen Climate Classification system, Elfrida has a semi-arid climate, abbreviated "BSk" on climate maps.

See also

 List of census-designated places in Arizona

References

External links

 Valley Union High School
 Elfrida Elementary School District
 Chiricahua Community Health Centers, Inc.
 Elfrida Library
 Elfrida Library History
 Elfrida Fire District

Unincorporated communities in Cochise County, Arizona
Unincorporated communities in Arizona
Census-designated place in Cochise County, Arizona